Celina Senior High School is a public high school located in Celina, Ohio, United States. It is the only high school in the city. Their mascot is a bulldog. They are members of the Western Buckeye League.  The average enrollment is around 1,100 students.

Ohio High School Athletic Association State Championships
 Boys' Bowling - 2018
 Girls' Basketball - 1991

Administrators

Notable alumni

 Jim Otis - Fullback for the Ohio State University Buckeyes from 1967 to 1969; NFL career with the New Orleans Saints, Kansas City Chiefs, and St. Louis Cardinals; most notable fullback to come out of Mercer County
 Dan Pifer

References

External links
 

High schools in Mercer County, Ohio
Public high schools in Ohio
High School